Prespa is a region shared between North Macedonia, Albania and Greece. It shares the same name with the two Prespa lakes which are situated in the middle of the region. The largest town is Resen in North Macedonia with 9,000 inhabitants.

History 
In today's borders, the region is divided between three countries, which is result of the division of the Ottoman territories of Europe after the two Balkan Wars. Prespa itself has an important geostrategic position. During the Roman rule through Prespa, the famous ancient Roman road "Via Egnatia" was built. In addition to road, several settlements were also built. In the 6th and 7th centuries in Prespa didn't settle permanently Slavic tribes. The Slavs skipped the region that had been already plundered and depopulated, but continued south to the Mediterranean coast.

In the late 10th and early 11th centuries, during the reign of the Cometopuls, besides Prespa Lake was mentioned also the town of Prespa, as the capital of the First Bulgarian Empire. This city was also the seat of the Bulgarian Patriarchate, whose seat was later transferred to Bulgarian Patriarchate of Ochrid. 

During 1888 in the village of German,  in Lower Prespa, the headstone of Samuel's parents was found, his father Nicholas, his mother Ripsimia and his brother David, dating from 993. It is one of the first written monuments in the Old Church Slavonic language. It is currently located in the Sofia Museum, most probably portrayed in the wake of the wars. From that period on the island of Achilles, in the small Prespa Lake, there are still remains of the Cathedral church erected by Samuel in honor of St. Achilles.

St. George's Church in the village Kurbinovo with a remarkable fresco painting of 1191, a notable example of medieval painting located within North Macedonia.

See also 

 Lake Prespa
 Resen Municipality, a municipality on North Macedonia's side of the Prespa Lakes
 Pustec (municipality), a municipality on Albania's side of the Prespa Lakes (also an ethnic Macedonian minority zone)
 Prespes, a municipality on Greece's side of the Prespa Lakes
 Prespa (medieval town)

References

Further reading

External links

Geography of North Macedonia
Resen Municipality
Historical regions in Greece
Florina (regional unit)
Historical regions in Albania